The Three Character Classic, commonly known as San Zi Jing, also translated as Trimetric Classic, is one of the Chinese classic texts. It was probably written in the 13th century and is mainly attributed to Wang Yinglin (王應麟, 1223–1296) during the Song dynasty. It is also attributed to Ou Shizi (1234–1324).

The work is not one of the traditional six Confucian classics, but rather the embodiment of Confucianism suitable for teaching young children. Until the latter part of the 1800s, it served as a child's first formal education at home. The text is written in triplets of characters for easy memorization. With illiteracy common for most people at the time, the oral tradition of reciting the classic ensured its popularity and survival through the centuries. With the short and simple text arranged in three-character verses, children learned many common characters, grammar structures, elements of Chinese history and the basis of Confucian morality, especially filial piety and respect for elders (the Five Relationships in Chinese society).

During the Ming and Qing dynasties, the Three Character Classic formed the basis of elementary education, along with Hundred Family Surnames and Thousand Character Classic. The group came to be known as San Bai Qian (Three, Hundred, Thousand), from the first character in their titles.  They were the almost universal introductory literacy texts for students, almost exclusively boys, from elite backgrounds and even for a number of ordinary villagers.  Each was available in many versions, printed cheaply, and available to all since they did not become superseded. When a student had memorized all three, they could recognize and pronounce, though not necessarily write or understand the meaning of, roughly 2,000 characters (there was some duplication among the texts). Since Chinese did not use an alphabet, this was an effective, though time-consuming, way of giving a "crash course" in character recognition before going on to understanding texts and writing characters.

The text fell into disuse during the Cultural Revolution given the state's opposition to non-socialist ideologies. The classic, however, continued to circulate in other parts of the Chinese-speaking world with its inclusion in the Chinese Almanac (通勝) along with several other classics such as the Thousand Character Classic.

The first four verses state the core credo of Confucianism, that is, that human nature is inherently good, as developed by Mencius, considered one of the most influential traditional Chinese philosophers after Confucius.

人之初 (rén zhī chū)     People at birth,
性本善 (xìng běn shàn)   Are naturally good (kind-hearted).
性相近 (xìng  xiāng jìn) Their natures are similar,
習相遠 (xí xiāng yuǎn)   (But) their habits make them different (from each other).

Even nowadays, the above two introductory quotes are very familiar to most youth in mainland China, Hong Kong and Taiwan, if not known by heart. Though the work is no longer taught at public schools (it is still taught in Beijing today if not in all schools), some parents still use this classic to teach their young children to pronounce Chinese characters. It is sometimes a game for elementary school children to show off who can recite the most sentences from this classic.

Editions
The Three Character Classic was translated in 1796 into Manchu as         Wylie: Manchu nikan ghergen i kamtsime sughe San tsz' ging pitghe, Möllendorff: Manju nikan hergen-i kamcime suhe San ze ging ni bithe, Translation: The Three Character Classic, in Manchu and Chinese.

The most well-known English translation of the text was completed by Herbert Giles in 1900 and revised in 1910. The translation was based on the original Song dynasty version. Giles had completed an earlier translation in the late 19th century but he rejected that and other early translations as inaccurate. Earlier translations into English include those by Robert Morrison, 1812; Solomon Caesar Malan and Hung Hsiu-chʻüan, 1856, and Stanislas Julien, 1864.

The following stanzas do not appear in the Giles translation and originally appeared in Simplified Chinese. They list the dynasties that followed the Song dynasty up to and including the founding of Republican China. These stanzas were probably added cumulatively sometime between late 13th century and after the founding of the People's Republic of China in 1949.

¹ this line replaces the original one in the Song version where it says "The Seventeen Dynastic Histories... 十七史...".

Reception 
The first two lines were recited at the Academy Awards 2021 by Chloé Zhao, the award winner for best director.

See also 
 Di Zi Gui
 Thousand Character Classic
 Hundred Family Surnames

Notes

References

 Original Chinese Text plus pinyin, modern Chinese translation, modern Chinese commentary and stories, plus complete translation of all material into English.

External links 

 
 
 Song dynasty Chinese edition with the Herbert Giles English translation
 On-line learner's edition at Yellowbridge site
 Read and hear the audio at this Chinese/English site
 (in Mandarin)
 Another site with audio of the San Zi Jing - Chinese only
 The Three Character Classic in Chinese with the Herbert Giles English Translation.
 Its debated revival in mainland China, China.org.cn

Chinese characters
Chinese classic texts
Chinese language
Chinese children's books